Sanchari Mondal  is an Indian actress who works in Bengali language TV serials and films, notable for playing Irabati in Joyee which was broadcast on Zee Bangla. She has also appeared in the television serials, Goyenda Ginni as Disha, Bhalobasa.com and Amar Durga. and as Charulata in the film Gulshan and on the 'Zait' series of Sananda TV.

TV series
 Goyenda Ginni as Disha (2016-2017) (Positive Role)
 Bhalobasa.com (supporting Role)
 Amar Durga as Torsha Mitra (2017-2019) (Episodic Role)
 Joyee as Irabati (2016-2017) (Negative Role)
Milon Tithi as Ginia 
Irabotir Chupkotha as Anushree (2019-2020) (Supporting Role)
Najor as Tina Singha Roy (in disguise) Jamini (2019-2020) (Main Negative Role)
Dhrubatara as Chandni Chowdhury (2020-2021) (Negative Role turned Positive)
Rimli as Koyena (2021) (Positive Role)
Ganntchhora as Kiara (2021- present) (Negative Role) (later replaced by Ankushri Maity)

Film
 Gulshan

References

External links

Bengali actresses
21st-century Indian actresses
Living people
Year of birth missing (living people)